Altheim (Alb) is a municipality in the Alb-Donau district, in Baden-Württemberg, Germany.

References

Alb-Donau-Kreis
Württemberg